Edgeware is a suburb of Christchurch, New Zealand, to the north of the central city. It is centred on a cluster of some 20 shops that make up Edgeware Village on Edgeware Road near Colombo Street's northern end. The boundaries of the suburb are debated. Google maps includes St Albans park as being within the boundaries of Edgeware, while excluding the Edgeware shops at the western end of Edgeware Road. 

Edgeware received national attention in the news in June 2006, when an out-of-control party on Edgeware Road resulted in the deaths of two schoolgirls.

Demographics

Edgeware had a population of 4,125 at the 2018 New Zealand census, an increase of 171 people (4.3%) since the 2013 census, and an increase of 441 people (12.0%) since the 2006 census. There were 1,863 households. There were 2,115 males and 2,013 females, giving a sex ratio of 1.05 males per female. The median age was 31.2 years (compared with 37.4 years nationally), with 465 people (11.3%) aged under 15 years, 1,437 (34.8%) aged 15 to 29, 1,884 (45.7%) aged 30 to 64, and 342 (8.3%) aged 65 or older.

Ethnicities were 69.1% European/Pākehā, 8.8% Māori, 2.6% Pacific peoples, 23.2% Asian, and 5.0% other ethnicities (totals add to more than 100% since people could identify with multiple ethnicities).

The proportion of people born overseas was 37.5%, compared with 27.1% nationally.

Although some people objected to giving their religion, 49.7% had no religion, 29.7% were Christian, 6.8% were Hindu, 1.2% were Muslim, 1.3% were Buddhist and 6.2% had other religions.

Of those at least 15 years old, 1,116 (30.5%) people had a bachelor or higher degree, and 462 (12.6%) people had no formal qualifications. The median income was $37,000, compared with $31,800 nationally. The employment status of those at least 15 was that 2,274 (62.1%) people were employed full-time, 468 (12.8%) were part-time, and 159 (4.3%) were unemployed.

References

Suburbs of Christchurch